This is a list of bus routes within the State of Penang in Malaysia. At present, Rapid Penang is the main public bus service operator within the state. There is also a double-decker bus service, known as Penang Hop-On Hop-Off, which mainly caters for tourists within George Town, the capital city of Penang.

Rapid Penang 
, Rapid Penang has a total of 56 routes throughout Greater Penang, which also includes routes into neighbouring Kedah and Perak. The routes are as categorised below.

Penang Island

Seberang Perai

Cross-strait BEST routes

Interstate routes

Penang Hop-On Hop-Off 
The Penang Hop-On Hop-Off bus service caters mainly for tourists within George Town, consisting of two circular routes within the city. Both routes are connected at Gurney Drive, which serves as an interchange where passengers can switch between the two routes.

See also
 Penang Hop-On Hop-Off
 Prasarana Malaysia
 Rapid Penang
 List of bus routes in Kuala Lumpur

References

External links
 Rapid Penang routes on myrapid website
 Rapid Penang routes on Moovit

Penang bus routes
Bus routes, Penang
Penang bus routes
Penang